Kill Your Girlfriend is the second EP recorded by the Deathrock/Gothic rock band Theatre of Ice. It rapidly became the group's largest selling record.

Musicians 
Brent Johnson - Vocals 
Dale Garrard - Guitar
Craig Moore - Guitar
George Carlston - Bass
Richard Hillquist - Drums

Track listing
Kill Your Girlfriend (live) - 4.03
Big Bikes at Nite - 1.48
Mommy Stinks Real Bad Now - 3.39
Miron - 3.05

Reviews
Maximum RockNRoll - Demented, sick, deranged, perverted, degrading—in other words, pure enjoyment.  This is brilliant raunchy rock and roll, obviously the product of disturbed minds.  Parental guidance suggested. (DF)
Flipside (fanzine) - Theatre of Ice are easily one of the more consistent bands releasing albums and singles.  They play an extremely varied sound, ranging from rock and roll, new wave, to gloom—all extremely catchy and well executed and this ep does not tarnish their image. (Krk)
Factsheet Five, Massachusetts - These recordings are more metallic and sillier than their early, wonderful gothic stuff. and it's quite a loss.  Any appeal of thus is likely to be strictly as a collector's item, for as a non-gloom band they're not too good. (MG)
Forced Exposure - ...much more punk rock than the last one, this sounds like the sorta psych that used to find a home on England's Lightning Records.  Production values still hover in the Plan 9 zone and the spook shit's still whacked-out enough to stand up and puggle and this packed to webs with real loose skunk-psych string action. [C/U 10]
Conflict - Almost metal song about wasting your squeeze, done to what vaguely sounds like the tune of Roky's "Bermuda", but I could be hallucinating.  Vocalist sound nothing like Peter Murphy or the guy from Empty Rituals, so this is a genuine progress, mark the date on your calendar.

Notes 

Theatre of Ice albums
1988 EPs